Afghanistan Medal may refer to:
Afghanistan Medal (United Kingdom), British campaign medal for service 1878–1880
Afghanistan Medal (Australia), Australian campaign medal for service 2001 onwards
Afghanistan Campaign Medal, US campaign medal for service 2001 onwards
Operational Service Medal for Afghanistan, UK campaign medal for service 2001 onwards
New Zealand General Service Medal 2002 (Afghanistan), New Zealand campaign medal for service 2001 onwards